William Williams (1840 – May 5, 1893) was a Union Navy sailor in the American Civil War and a recipient of the U.S. military's highest decoration, the Medal of Honor, for helping to free his grounded ship.

Military service
A native of Ireland born in 1840, Williams immigrated to the U.S. and joined the Navy from Pennsylvania. On November 16, 1863, Lehigh was in Charleston Harbor providing support for Union troops on shore when the ship ran aground on a sand bar and came under heavy fire from Fort Moultrie. Officers were about to give an "abandon ship" order when Williams and two other sailors, Landsman Frank S. Gile and Seaman Horatio Nelson Young, volunteered to make one more attempt. Despite intense Confederate artillery fire, the men rowed a small boat from Lehigh to Nahant, trailing a line attached to a hawser. This operation successfully completed, Nahant was able to tow Lehigh off the sandbar to safety. For this action, Williams, Gile, and Young were each awarded the Medal of Honor five months later, on April 16, 1864. Two sailors involved in the earlier attempts to save Lehigh, Coxswain Thomas Irving and Gunner's Mate George W. Leland, also received the medal at the same time.

Medal of Honor citation
Rank and organization: Landsman, U.S. Navy. Accredited to: Pennsylvania. G.O. No.: 32, 16 April 1864.

Williams' official Medal of Honor citation reads:
On board the U.S.S. Lehigh, Charleston Harbor, 16 November 1863, during the hazardous task of freeing the Lehigh, which had been grounded, and was under heavy enemy fire from Fort Moultrie. After several previous attempts had been made, Williams succeeded in passing in a small boat from the Lehigh to the Nahant with a line bent on a hawser. This courageous action while under severe enemy fire enabled the Lehigh to be freed from her helpless position.

References

External links 
 

1840 births
1893 deaths
Irish emigrants to the United States (before 1923)
People of Pennsylvania in the American Civil War
Union Navy sailors
United States Navy Medal of Honor recipients
Irish-born Medal of Honor recipients
American Civil War recipients of the Medal of Honor
People from County Louth
Burials at Mount Moriah Cemetery (Philadelphia)